Soumaintrain is a commune in the Yonne department in Bourgogne-Franche-Comté in north-central France. The local  is a washed-rind cheese with protected geographical indication.

See also
Communes of the Yonne department

References

Communes of Yonne